Sun Alliance may refer to:

Sun Alliance (political alliance), a political alliance in Benin
Sun Alliance (company), an insurance company that merged into the RSA Insurance Group